Sharpnose stingray may refer to:
Dasyatis acutirostra
Dasyatis zugei
Himantura gerrardi
Himantura jenkinsii